Sir Frank Merry Stenton, FBA (17 May 1880 – 15 September 1967) was an English historian of Anglo-Saxon England, a professor of history at the University of Reading (1926–1946), president of the Royal Historical Society (1937–1945), Reading University's vice-chancellor (1946–1950).

Life

The son of Henry Stenton of Southwell, Nottinghamshire, he was educated at Keble College, Oxford, and was elected an Honorary Fellow in 1947.

With Allen Mawer, Stenton wrote the second English Place-Name Society volume, The Place-Names of Buckinghamshire, published in 1925. He delivered the Ford Lectures at Oxford University in 1929. He went on to write Anglo-Saxon England, a volume of the Oxford History of England, first published in 1943 and widely considered a classic history of the period.

Stenton was a professor of history at the University of Reading (1926 – 1946), and subsequently the university's vice-chancellor (1946–1950). During his period as vice-chancellor at Reading, he presided over the university's purchase of Whiteknights Park, creating the new campus that allowed for the expansion of the university in later decades. In November 2008, it was announced that a new hall of residence to be constructed on that campus would be named Stenton Hall, in his honour. The annual Stenton Lecture, given by an eminent historian, was inaugurated at Reading University in 1967.

He was knighted in the 1948 New Year Honours, and received the accolade from King George VI at Buckingham Palace on 10 February 1948.

His wife, Doris Mary Stenton, wrote a preface to the third edition of Anglo-Saxon England, published after his death, and edited Preparatory to Anglo-Saxon England: Being the Collected Papers of Frank Merry Stenton, published in 1970. She was an historian in her own right, producing English Society in the Early Middle Ages for the Pelican History of England, and The English Woman in History (1957).

Stenton's papers, together with those of his wife Doris, Lady Stenton, their library and his coin collection are part of the special collections at Reading University.

Publications
Stenton's major publications were The First Century of English Feudalism, 1066–1166 (1932) and Anglo-Saxon England (1943). Other publications include:

 "The Danes in England". History, 5 (1920): 173–177. doi: 10.1111/j.1468-229X.1920.tb01326.x
 Types of Manorial Structure in the Northern Danelaw
 Documents illustrative of the social and economic history of the Danelaw, from various collections (1920)

References

External links

 
 Stenton Papers
 Stenton Library
 Stenton Coin Collection
 Audio recording of Stenton's 1958 lecture "The Anglo-Saxon Coinage and Historians" to the British Numismatic Society

1880 births
1967 deaths
20th-century English historians
Academics of the University of Reading
Alumni of Keble College, Oxford
Anglo-Saxon studies scholars
British medievalists
Knights Bachelor
Presidents of the Royal Historical Society
Toponymists
Vice-Chancellors of the University of Reading
Contributors to the Victoria County History
Corresponding Fellows of the Medieval Academy of America